Boehmeria glomerulifera Miq as known as Malabar tree nettle is a Dicot large shrub or small tree native to Asia. It belongs to the family Urticaceae.

For image look at flowers of india

Description
Boehmeria glomerulifera is a shrub or small tree growing 1–5 m in height.

Habitat
Undergrowth in subtropical evergreen and semi-evergreen forest till 1400m

Distribution
Indo-Malesia
SW Guangxi, SE Xizang, S Yunnan Bhutan, India, Indonesia, Laos, Myanmar, Sri Lanka, Thailand, Vietnam

References

Boehmeria
Flora of China
Flora of the Indian subcontinent
Flora of Indo-China
Taxa named by Friedrich Anton Wilhelm Miquel